John Saumares D.D. (d. 1 September 1697) was a Canon of Windsor from 1671 - 1697 and Dean of Guernsey from 1662 - 1697.

Career

He was educated at Pembroke College, Oxford and graduated DD 1671

He was appointed:
Rector of St Martin’s Guernsey 1662
Dean of Guernsey 1662 - 1697
Rector of Hartley Westpall 1682 - 1684
Rector of Hasely 1688
Chaplain to King Charles II

He was appointed to the fourth stall in St George's Chapel, Windsor Castle in 1671, and held the stall until 1697.

Notes 

Year of birth missing
1697 deaths
Canons of Windsor
Deans of Guernsey